Sophia Churney is an English singer-songwriter and musician, She is best known for her work with the band Ooberman, as well as their side acts Symphonika, The Magic Theatre, and Ooberon. Her brother was the late musical performer Russell Churney.

Churney was a psychology teacher at West Kirby Grammar School on the Wirral, leaving in 2006.

References

Year of birth missing (living people)
Living people
English women singers
Musicians from Liverpool
English keyboardists